The Jordan Point Light was a lighthouse located on Jordan Point on the James River in Prince George County, Virginia, near the south end of the present Benjamin Harrison Memorial Bridge.

History
The history of this station is unclear, but some sources indicate that a light station was first established on Jordan Point in 1855. This consisted of a keeper's house with a masthead light on the roof. This arrangement was replaced circa 1875 (possibly as early as 1870) by a separate  pyramidal wooden tower that housed a sixth order Fresnel lens and a fog bell. A new keeper's house was constructed in 1888.

In 1927 the station was deactivated and the wooden tower was later demolished.  In 1941 a new steel skeleton tower was erected on the site of the old tower; this skeleton tower is still in service as the rear light of the Jordan Point Range, Light List #2-12420.  Although the wooden tower is long gone the keeper's house built in 1888 still stands.  It was extensively renovated in 2009 and is a private residence.

Notes

References

Jordan Point Light, from the Chesapeake Chapter of the United States Lighthouse Society

Lighthouses in Virginia
James River (Virginia)
Lighthouses completed in 1855
Lighthouses completed in 1875
Houses completed in 1888
Lighthouses completed in 1941
Towers completed in 1841
Buildings and structures in Prince George County, Virginia
Lighthouses in the Chesapeake Bay